Crawford Bay is a bay in Australia located in the north of Western Australia, located about 60 miles from Broome.

References

Bays of Western Australia